Rasul Kudayev is a Russian citizen who was held in extrajudicial detention in the United States Guantanamo Bay detention camp in Cuba. 
Kudayev is a Muslim from the Russian republic of Kabardino-Balkaria. 

In 1995, while a young teenager, Kudayev won a wrestling championship.
His mother and brother stated that, in 2000, while still a teenager, Kudayev traveled to Central Asia to advance his sports career.

Kudayev, and six other Russian Guantanamo detainees (including Ruslan Odizhev who also lived in Nalchik), were repatriated to Russia, where they faced charges of illegal border crossing, being members of a criminal group and being a mercenary in an armed conflict, but were released without trial shortly after.

In 2005, he was arrested in Nalchik for allegedly taking part in the preparation of the rebel raid, and participation in the attack itself (taking the road police post in Khasanya suburb of Nalchik).

On December 2, 2008, he was reported to have been seriously ill.
According to Human Rights Watch, Kudayev has yet to stand trial.  They reported that he acquired serious liver disease in Guantanamo, which Russian authorities have declined to treat.  They report that he was receiving medical treatment for his liver disease at the time authorities assert he was engaging in the Nalchik attack.  They claim his confession was coerced through beatings and coercive interrogation techniques.

Russian detention
Rasul Kudayev was taken into custody in October 2005.
The Washington Post reported he was apprehended: "in the southern Russian city of Nalchik after an assault on government facilities."
Russian authorities have held him in extrajudicial detention—they have not laid any charges against him.

In December 2014, the court case on the raid was still in progress.

Pentagon claim he had "returned to the fight"

On May 20, 2009, the New York Times, citing an unreleased Pentagon document, reported that Department of Defense officials claimed Rasul Kudayev was one of 74 former Guantanamo captives who "are engaged in terrorism or militant activity."

References

External links
 The Pentagon Can’t Count: 22 Juveniles Held at Guantánamo Andy Worthington

1984 births
Living people
People from Prokhladny, Kabardino-Balkar Republic
Russian Muslims
Russian wrestlers
Guantanamo detainees known to have been released
Russian extrajudicial prisoners of the United States
Juveniles held at the Guantanamo Bay detention camp
Sportspeople from Kabardino-Balkaria